Hispanic and Latino are ethnonyms used to refer collectively to the inhabitants of the United States who are of Spanish or Latin American ancestry. While the terms are sometimes used interchangeably, for example, by the United States Census Bureau, Hispanic includes people with ancestry from Spain and Latin American Spanish-speaking countries, while Latino includes people from Latin American countries that were formerly colonized by Spain and Portugal. 

Hispanic was first used and defined by the U.S. Federal Office of Management and Budget's (OMB) Directive No. 15 in 1977, which defined Hispanic as "a person of Mexican, Puerto Rican, Cuban, Central America or South America or other Spanish culture or origin, regardless of race." The term was formed out of a collaboration with Mexican American political elites to encourage cultural assimilation into American society among all Hispanic/Latino peoples and move away from the anti-assimilationist politics of Chicano identity, which had gained prominence in the preceding decades through the Chicano Movement. The rise of Hispanic identity paralleled an emerging era of conservatism in the United States during the 1980s.

Latino first emerged at the local level through media outlets in the early 1990s. The Los Angeles Times was one of the first major newspapers to use the term Latino instead of Hispanic. Some local panethnic institutions and Spanish-language media adopted the term for community unity and political organizing. The emergence of Latino resulted in increasing criticism over Hispanic. Many supporters of Latino argued that Hispanic was reasserting a colonial dynamic or relationship with Spain. Others argued that Hispanic failed to acknowledge mestizo culture and political struggle as well as erased the existence of Indigenous, Afro-Latin American, and Asian Latinos peoples throughout the Americas. Latino was also described as more inclusive. Latino was included along with Hispanic on the 2000 U.S. census.

There remains no definitive consensus over which term should be used, which has led to the rise of Hispanic/Latino and Hispanic and Latino as categorical terms often used by government institutions and prominent organizations. The choice between the terms is frequently associated with location: persons in the Eastern United States tend to prefer Hispanic, whereas those in the West tend to prefer Latino. According to a 2011 study by the Pew Research Center, the majority (51%) of Hispanic and Latino Americans prefer to identify with their families' country of origin or nationality, while only 24% prefer the terms Hispanic or Latino. Both Hispanic and Latino are generally used to denote people living in the United States. Outside of the United States, people living in Latin American countries usually refer to themselves by the names of their respective countries of origin.

History
 was the Latin name given to a person from Hispania during Roman rule. The ancient Roman Hispania, which roughly comprised what is currently called the Iberian Peninsula, included the contemporary states of Spain, Portugal, and Andorra, and the British Overseas Territory of Gibraltar.

The term Hispanic was adopted by the United States government in the early 1970s during the administration of Richard Nixon after the Hispanic members of an interdepartmental Ad Hoc Committee to develop racial and ethnic definitions recommended that a universal term encompassing all Hispanic subgroups—including Central and South Americans—be adopted. As the 1970 census did not include a question on Hispanic origin on all census forms—instead relying on a sample of the population via an extended form ("Is this person's origin or descent: Mexican; Puerto Rican; Cuban; Central or South American; Other Spanish; or None of these"), the members of the committee wanted a common designation to better track the social and economic progress of the group vis-à-vis the general population.

Legal scholar Laura E. Gómez notes that key members of the Mexican American political elite with assimilationist ideologies, all of whom were middle-aged men, helped popularize the term Hispanic among the Mexican American community, which in turn fueled both electronic and print media to use the term when referring to Mexican Americans in the 1980s. Gómez conducted a series of interviews with Mexican American political elites on their role in promoting Hispanic and found that one of the main reasons was because it stood in contrast to Chicano identity: "The Chicano label reflected the more radical political agenda of Mexican-Americans in the 1960s and 1970s, and the politicians who call themselves Hispanic today are the harbringers of a more conservative, more accomadationist politics." Some of these elites sought to encourage cultural assimilation through Hispanic within their community and not be seen as "militant" in order to appeal to white American sensibilities, particularly in regard to separating themselves from Black political consciousness. Gómez records:

The designation has since been used in local and federal employment, mass media, academia, and business market research. It has been used in the U.S. Census since 1980. Because of the popularity of Latino in the western portion of the United States, the government adopted this term as well in 1997, and used it in the 2000 census.

Previously, Hispanic and Latino Americans were categorized as "Spanish-Americans", "Spanish-speaking Americans", or "Spanish-surnamed Americans". However:

 Although a large majority of Hispanic and Latino Americans have Spanish ancestry, most are not of direct, "from-Spain-to-the-U.S." Spanish descent; many are not primarily of Spanish descent; and some are not of Spanish descent at all. People whose ancestors or who themselves arrived in the United States directly from Spain are a tiny minority of the Hispanic or Latino population (see figures in this article), and there are Hispanic/Latino Americans who are of other European ancestries in addition to Spanish (e.g., Portuguese, Italian, German, and Middle Eastern, such as the Lebanese).
 Most Hispanic and Latino Americans can speak Spanish, but not all, and most Spanish-speaking Americans are Hispanic or Latino, but not all. For example, Hispanic/Latino Americans often do not speak Spanish by the third generation, and some Americans who speak Spanish may not identify themselves with Spanish-speaking Americans as an ethnic group.
 Not all Hispanic and Latino Americans have Spanish surnames, and most Spanish-surnamed Americans are Hispanic or Latino, but not all, e.g., Filipino surnames. Those without Spanish surnames but of Hispanic or Latino origin include politician Bill Richardson, former National Football League (NFL) star Jim Plunkett, and actress Salma Hayek.

Usage of Hispanic 

The term Hispanic has been the source of several debates in the United States. Within the United States, the term originally referred typically to the Hispanos of New Mexico until the U.S. government used it in the 1970 Census to refer to "a person of Mexican, Puerto Rican, Cuban, South or Central American, or other Spanish culture or origin, regardless of race." The OMB did not accept the recommendation to retain the single term Hispanic. Instead, the OMB has decided that the term should be "Hispanic or Latino" because regional usage of the terms differs. Hispanic is commonly used in the eastern portion of the United States, whereas Latino is commonly used in the western portion. Since the 2000 Census, the identifier has changed from "Hispanic" to "Spanish/Hispanic/Latino".

Other federal and local government agencies and non-profit organizations include Brazilians and Portuguese in their definition of Hispanic. The US Department of Transportation defines Hispanic as "persons of Mexican, Puerto Rican, Cuban, Dominican, Central or South American, or others [of] Spanish or Portuguese culture or origin, regardless of race." This definition has been adopted by the Small Business Administration as well as by many federal, state, and municipal agencies for the purposes of awarding government contracts to minority-owned businesses.
 
The Congressional Hispanic Caucus (CHC)—which was organized in 1976 by five Hispanic Congressmen: Herman Badillo (NY), Baltasar Corrada del Río (PR), Kika de la Garza (TX), Henry B. Gonzalez (TX) and Edward Roybal (CA)—and the Congressional Hispanic Conference include representatives of Spanish and Portuguese descent. The Hispanic Society of America is dedicated to the study of the arts and cultures of Spain, Portugal, and Latin America. The Hispanic Association of Colleges and Universities, which proclaims itself the champion of Hispanic success in higher education, has member institutions in the US, Puerto Rico, Latin America, Spain, and Portugal.

In a 2012 study, most Spanish speakers of Spanish or Latin American descent in the United States did not choose to use the terms Hispanic or Latino when describing their identity. Instead, they preferred to be identified by their country of origin. Over half of those surveyed said they had no preference for either term. When forced to choose, 33% chose Hispanic and 14% chose "Latino."

A study done in 2009 shows that there is not a significant difference between the attitudes or preferences towards the terms among young (18–25) and older individuals. The statistical numbers are almost identical. Among the overall Hispanic population, young Hispanics prefer to identify themselves with their family's country of origin. Both groups prefer the term "American" versus "Latino/Hispanic". Yet, older Hispanics are more likely to identify as white than younger Hispanics. When it comes to the preference of Latino or Hispanic, the younger subgroup is more likely to state that it does not matter. If they do have a preference, both groups prefer the term Hispanic rather than Latino.

Origin of Latino 

Scholar Juan Francisco Martinez writes that "France began talking about Latin America during the rule of Napoleon III as a way of distinguishing between those areas of the Americas originally colonized by Europeans of Latin descent and those colonized by peoples from northern Europe. But the term was used to justify French intervention in the young republics of Latin America."

The adoption of the term Latino by the U.S. Census Bureau in 2000 and its subsequent media attention brought about several controversies and disagreements, specifically in the United States and, to a lesser extent, in Mexico and other Spanish-speaking countries. Regarding it as an arbitrary, generic term, many Latin American scholars, journalists and organizations have objected to the mass media use of the word Latino, pointing out that such ethnonyms are optional and should be used only to describe people involved in the practices, ideologies and identity politics of their supporters. They argue that if Hispanic is an imposed official term, then so is Latino, since it was the French who coined the expression "Latin America" to refer to the Spanish, French, and Portuguese-speaking countries of the Western Hemisphere, during their support of the Second Mexican Empire.

Distinctions between Latino, Latina, and Hispanic 
Some authorities of American English maintain a distinction between the terms Hispanic and Latino:

The AP Stylebook also distinguishes between the terms. The Stylebook limits "Hispanic" to persons "from—or whose ancestors were from—a Spanish-speaking land or culture. Latino and Latina are sometimes preferred". It provides a more expansive definition, however, of Latino. The Stylebook definition of Latino includes not only persons of Spanish-speaking land or ancestry, but also more generally includes persons "from—or whose ancestors were from— ... Latin America." The Stylebook specifically lists Brazilians as an example of a group that can be considered Latino.

Latino is traditionally reserved for males or a combination of males and females, and Latina for females. A group of Latina women is termed Latinas, whereas a group of Latino men or a combination of Latino and Latina individuals are designated as "Latinos".

Alternative terms

Latino/a and Latin@ 
Both Latino/a and Latin@ aim to challenge the gender binary that is inherent in Portuguese and Spanish, which combines the Portuguese/Spanish masculine ending  and the feminine .

Latin@ may be used to promote gender neutrality or be used to encompass both Latinos and Latinas without using the masculine "Latinos" designation for the mixed genders group.

Latinx 

The term Latinx was introduced in the early 2000s as a gender-neutral term for Latino/Latina, in addition to encompassing those who identify outside of the gender binary, such as those who are transgender, or those who are gender-fluid. The term has been embraced by the Latin LGBTQ+ communities.

The term Latinx reportedly surfaced with LGBTQ+ spaces on the internet in 2004, but use of the term did not take off until a decade later.

The term has drawn criticisms for its invented roots, in addition to its perceived corruption of the Spanish language.

Hispanic/Latino nationalities

The U.S. government has defined "Hispanic or Latino" persons as being "persons who trace their origin [to] ... Central and South America, and other Spanish cultures". The Census Bureau's 2010 census provides a definition of the terms Latino and Hispanic: "Hispanic or Latino" refers to a person of Mexican, South or Central American, or other Spanish culture or origin regardless of race. It allows respondents to self-define whether they were Latino or Hispanic and then identify their specific country or place of origin. On its website, the Census Bureau defines "Hispanic or Latino" persons as being "persons who trace their origin [to] ... Spanish-speaking Central and South America countries, and other Spanish cultures".

These definitions thus arguably do not include Brazilian Americans, especially since the Census Bureau classifies Brazilian Americans as a separate ancestry group from "Hispanic or Latino". A surge of Portuguese Americans faced a big scare when the Census Bureau revealed plans to categorize people of Portuguese descent as "Hispanics" in the 2020 census. The unified feelings of dispute were displayed in a national survey conducted by Palcus within the Portuguese-American community. The results were an overwhelming 90% of participants objecting to Portuguese Americans being classified under the Hispanic ethnicity.

Fortunately for those opposed to the Portuguese-as-Hispanic classification, the Census Bureau later released an update stating that they never intended to classify people of Portuguese descent as Hispanic in the 2020 census. The 28 Hispanic or Latino American groups in the Census Bureau's reports are the following: "Mexican,; Central American: Costa Rican, Guatemalan, Honduran, Nicaraguan, Panamanian, Salvadoran, Other Central American; South American: Bolivian, Chilean, Colombian, Ecuadorian, Paraguayan, Peruvian, Venezuelan, Other South American; Other Hispanic or Latino: Spanish, Spanish American, All other Hispanic".

Criticism from the media 
In the U.S., the terms are officially voluntary, self-designated classifications. However, the mass media has helped propagate them irrespective of this fact. The rapid spread of Latino in the U.S. has been possible due to the policies of certain newspapers such as the Los Angeles Times and other California-based media during the 1990s. Raoul Lowery Contreras writes:

Lowery Contreras argues that, according to the statistics of the Census Bureau, most middle class people with Latin American background living in the U.S. reject the term. He traces the polarization of the word to Los Angeles Times columnist Frank del Olmo, who regarded the term Hispanic as "ugly and imprecise". He writes:

Latino, Hispanic or national identity 
The naming dispute is a phenomenon that has its roots mainly in California and other neighboring states. Before the adoption of the ethnonym "Hispanic or Latino" by the U.S. government, the term Hispanic was commonly used for statistical purposes. However, many people did not feel satisfied with the term and started campaigns promoting the use of Latino as a new ethnonym. The Office of Management and Budget has stated that the new term should be, indeed, "Hispanic or Latino" because the usage of the terms differs—"Hispanics is commonly used in the eastern portion of the United States, whereas Latino is commonly used in the western portion".

Despite this, debates regarding the proper name of the perceived homogeneous population of U.S. citizens with Latin American or Spanish background still abound, and are even more acute. To find out how much people agree or disagree with either term, many polls have been conducted. According to a December 2000 poll by Hispanic Trends, 65% of the registered voters preferred the word Hispanic, while 30% chose to identify themselves as Latino. Daniel David Arreola, in his book Hispanic spaces, Latino places: community and cultural diversity in contemporary America, points out that many Latin Americans feel more comfortable identifying themselves with their country of origin:

A Pew Hispanic Center survey conducted November 9 – December 7, 2011, and published April 4, 2012, reported:

Academic reception 

One of the major arguments of people who object to either term is not only the perceived stereotypical overtones they carry, but the unjust and unfair labeling of people who do not even belong to the practices and ideologies of such identities. This is true of many indigenous peoples such as the Wixarikas and the Lacandones, who still practice their own religious rituals without syncretism with Catholic elements. Journalist Juan Villegas writes:

These characteristics that are often used, such as Hollywood, to classify a person of Latina/o culture and identity has been termed by scholars, "As a system of media signification, Latinidad is a performative and performed dynamic set of popular signs associated with Latinas/os and Latina/o identity. Common signifiers of Latinidad are language, linguistic accents, religious symbols, tropical and spicy foods, and brown skin as a phenotypic identity." (Berg Ramirez p. 40–41).  As Guzman discusses, "signifiers most commonly associated with Latinidad produce a sense of authenticity within media texts", (p. 235). Ramirez continues to discuss how these signifiers of Latinidad do not necessarily mean they are stereotypical. In actuality, Latina/os may utilize these "signifiers" for self-identifying purposes. In terms of media portrayal, Hollywood has invested a lot of time and money to develop a general notion of "Latinidad" because marketers, advertisers and media content producers have found that they are a very bankable demographic, thus turned "Latinidad" and Latina/o culture and identity to a commodity. What is problematic about this is when creating this general notion, the diversity within this demographic becomes suppressed and flattened in a demographic that is very heterogeneous just so marketers, advertisers and media content producers can communicate their version of "authentic" racial identity to consumers. Consequently, this opens the space for stereotypes to be created and perpetuated.

Others, such as Catherine Alexandra Carter and Rodolfo Acuña, address the issue from a more global and political perspective, stressing the importance of terms like Latino or Hispanic for the marketing industry and for statistical ends:

Davila expands on the ramifications of the mass media's dominant use of Latino or Hispanic to categorize this demographic, "... the extent to which assertions of cultural differences intersect with dominant norms of American citizenship that give preeminence to white, monolingual, middle-class producers of and contributors to a political body defined in national terms. My concern is ... with how notions of citizenship, belonging, and entitlement are directly intertwined and predicated on dominant U.S. nationalist categories. Such categories conflate race, culture, and language with nationality, establishing the hierarchies and coordinates against which cultural and linguistic differences are ultimately evaluated (Ong 1999; Williams 1989). It is therefore these hierarchies that frame the discourses of Latinidad channeled in the media, as well as the media's treatment of language and what it may potentially communicate to and about Latino's claim to belonging, and in what terms they may or may not be within the political community of the United States." Consequently, this may leave issues, concerns, and topics relevant to this demographic left unheard, discussed and addressed. They are left invisible, therefore not only conflating the cultural differences, but also marginalizing them for the sake of convenience and marketability to the mass media. However, this is not to say this is a monolithic issue. Instead, this further gives incentive for the demographic to create a space in which they can transform these notions where the representations are more diverse, complex and authentic.

Not everyone rejects the terms and in fact feel that this idea of Latinidad is taken for granted. G. Christina Mora, author and UC Berkeley sociologist professor emphasizes the importance of the Hispanic term. In her book, "Making Hispanics: How Activists, Bureaucrats, and Media Constructed a New American" she explains the origins of the term and how it positively unites Hispanics. The term officially came into existence through United States government but it was due to an activist movement. Before this term, groups such as Mexicans, Cubans, and Puerto Ricans were only accounted for in census data as "white". The lack of specific data tied to Hispanics failed to show their social circumstance and therefore could not create necessary changes. There was no data to back up that they were significantly being affected by poverty, discrimination, and disadvantageous education. Without data, Hispanics would not receive adequate funding to change their circumstances and future. Due to the activism on behalf of Chicano and Puerto Rican individuals, there is data that supports and unites a group towards social equality.

Mora, states the following about the term and what she hopes it will mean for her daughter:

"I hope that my daughter will be conscious that the idea of Latino/Hispanic was actually rooted in an effort to work for social justice and political inclusion. Though we are a diverse community, many still grapple with disadvantage, discrimination and underrepresentation. All in all, I hope my daughter will embrace her Latinidad by being conscious of its roots in social justice and by continuing the cause of civil rights and political participation in America."

See also 

 Hispanic and Latino Americans
 Media bias
 Native American name controversy
 Naming controversy
 Race and ethnicity in Latin America

References

Further reading

External links 
Los Angeles Times – Look beyond the 'Latino' label
The Term 'Latino' Describes No One
Latino or Hispanic Panic: Which Term Should We Use?
Yale University – Understanding Ethnic Labels and Puerto Rican Identity
Latino Times has 20-1 ratio of the use of Latino over Hispanic from news articles worldwide.

The Difference Between Latino vs Hispanic

Hispanic and Latino
Hispanidad
Latin American studies
Mass media-related controversies in the United States
Naming controversies